The men's foil was one of eight fencing events on the fencing at the 1988 Summer Olympics programme. It was the twentieth appearance of the event. The competition was held from 20 to 21 September 1988. 68 fencers from 29 nations competed. Nations had been limited to three fencers each since 1928. The event was won by Stefano Cerioni of Italy, the nation's second consecutive and seventh overall (matching France for most all-time) victory in the men's foil. Cerioni was the ninth man to win multiple medalsin the event. Udo Wagner earned East Germany's first medal in the event with his silver, while Aleksandr Romankov's bronze put the Soviet Union back on the podium after a one-Games absence caused by the boycott. Romankov also became the third man to win three medals in the event.

Background

This was the 20th appearance of the event, which has been held at every Summer Olympics except 1908 (when there was a foil display only rather than a medal event). Seven of the eight quarterfinalists from 1984 returned: gold medalist Mauro Numa of Italy, silver medalist Matthias Behr of West Germany, bronze medalist Stefano Cerioni of Italy, and quarterfinal losers Thierry Soumagne of Belgium, Andrea Borella of Italy, Matthias Gey of West Germany, and Philippe Omnès of France. Also returning was Alexandr Romankov of the Soviet Union, who had won silver in 1976 and bronze in 1980 but had not competed in 1984 due to the boycott. Numa, Borella, and Gey had won the three world championships since the 1984 Games; Romankov had won 6 world championships but none since 1983.

Aruba and Indonesia each made their debut in the men's foil. France and the United States each made their 18th appearance, tied for most of any nation; France had missed only the 1904 (with fencers not traveling to St. Louis) and the 1912 (boycotted due to a dispute over rules) foil competitions, while the United States had missed the inaugural 1896 competition and boycotted the 1980 Games altogether.

Competition format

The 1988 tournament used a three-phase format very similar to that of 1984, though the second phase (double elimination) round expanded from 16 to 32 fencers.

The first phase was a multi-round round-robin pool play format; each fencer in a pool faced each other fencer in that pool once. There were three pool rounds: 
 The first round had 12 pools of 5 or 6 fencers each, with the top 4 in each pool advancing.
 The second round had 8 pools of 6 fencers each, with the top 5 in each pool advancing.
 The third round had 8 pools of 5 fencers each, with the top 4 in each pool advancing.

The second phase was a truncated double-elimination tournament. Four fencers advanced to the final round through the winners brackets and four more advanced via the repechage.

The final phase was a single elimination tournament with a bronze medal match.

Bouts in the round-robin pools were to 5 touches; bouts in the double-elimination and final rounds were to 10 touches.

Schedule

All times are Korea Standard Time adjusted for daylight savings (UTC+10)

Results

Round 1

Round 1 Pool A

Round 1 Pool B

Round 1 Pool C

Round 1 Pool D

Round 1 Pool E

Round 1 Pool F

Round 1 Pool G

Round 1 Pool H

Round 1 Pool I

Round 1 Pool J

Round 1 Pool K

Round 1 Pool L

Round 2

Round 2 Pool A

Round 2 Pool A

Round 2 Pool B

Round 2 Pool C

Round 2 Pool D

Round 2 Pool E

Round 2 Pool F

Round 2 Pool G

Round 2 Pool H

Round 3

Round 3 Pool A

Round 3 Pool B

Round 3 Pool C

Round 3 Pool D

Round 3 Pool E

Round 3 Pool F

Round 3 Pool G

Round 3 Pool H

Double elimination rounds

Winners brackets

Winners group 1

Winners group 2

Winners group 3

Winners group 4

Repechages

Repechage 1

Repechage 2

Repechage 3

Repechage 4

Final round

Final classification

References

Foil men
Men's events at the 1988 Summer Olympics